Somerset 2 South (known as Tribute Somerset 2 South for sponsorship reasons) is an English rugby union league which sits at the tenth level of league rugby union in England alongside its counterpart Somerset 2 North.  When the division was founded in 1987 it was a single league known as Somerset 2, but since 2006 it has been split into two regional divisions.  

Somerset 2 North currently involves teams from the southern part of Somerset.  1st, 2nd and even 3rd XV sides can participate in the division as long as they are not from the same club.  The league champions are promoted to Somerset 1 while relegated teams drop to Somerset 3 South.

Teams 2021-22

2020–21
Due to the COVID-19 pandemic, the 2020–21 season was cancelled.

Teams 2019–20

Original teams

When league rugby began in 1987 this league (known as Somerset 2) was a single division containing the following teams from Somerset and parts of Bristol:

Avon
Bath Old Edwardians
Blagdon
Bristol Harlequins
Chard
Cheddar Valley
Imperial
St. Bernadette's Old Boys
Stothert & Pitt
Wells
Winscombe

Somerset 2 honours

Somerset 2 (1987–1993)

The original Somerset 2 was a tier 10 league with promotion to Somerset 1 and relegation to Somerset 3.

Somerset 2 (1993–1996)

The creation of National League 5 South for the 1993–94 season meant that Somerset 2 dropped to become a tier 11 league.  Promotion continued to Somerset 1 and relegation to Somerset 3.

Somerset 2 (1996–2000)

The cancellation of National League 5 South at the end of the 1995–96 season meant that Somerset 2 reverted to being a tier 10 league.  Promotion continued to Somerset 1 and relegation to Somerset 3.

Somerset 2 (2000–2006)

Somerset 2 remained as a tier 10 league.  Promotion continued to Somerset 1, while the cancellation of Somerset 3 at the end of the 1999–00 season meant there was no longer relegation.

Somerset 2 South (2006–2009)

At the start of the 2006–07 Somerset 2 was split into two regional divisions - Somerset 2 North and Somerset 2 South - both remaining at tier 10 of the league system.  This restructuring was to enable 2nd XV and 3rd XV sides to play in the Somerset leagues for the first time and would make up most of the teams.  Promotion continued to Somerset 1 while relegation was now to Somerset 3 South.  From the 2007–08 season onward the league sponsor would be Tribute.

Somerset 2 South (2009–present)

Despite widespread restructuring by the RFU at the end of the 2008–09 season, Somerset 2 South and its counterpart Somerset 2 South remained as tier 10 league. Promotion continued to Somerset 1, while relegation was to Somerset 3 South. The league continued to be sponsored by Tribute.

Number of league titles

Avonvale (2)
Castle Cary (2)
Crewkerne (2)
Morganians (2)
Wells (2)
Winscombe (2)
Avon (1)
Bath Old Edwardians (1)
Blagdon (1)
Bridgwater & Albion II (1)
Bristol Barbarians (1)
Broadplain (1)
Chard II (1)
Cheddar Valley (1)
Imperial (1)
North Petherton (1)
Old Sulians (1)
St. Bernadette's Old Boys (1)
Stothert & Pitt
Taunton II (1)
Taunton III (1)
Tor (1)
Wellington II (1)
Wells II (1)
Weston-super-Mare II (1)
Wiveliscombe (1)
Wyvern (1)

Notes

See also 
 South West Division RFU
 Somerset RFU
 Somerset Premier
 Somerset 1
 Somerset 2 North
 Somerset 3 North
 Somerset 3 South
 English rugby union system
 Rugby union in England

References 

10
Rugby union in Somerset